Hyphomicrobium chloromethanicum is an aerobic, methylotrophic bacteria from the genus of Hyphomicrobium which can utilize chloromethane as the only source of carbon.

References

Hyphomicrobiales
Bacteria described in 2001